Dona Maria Pia (16 October 1847 – 5 July 1911) was by birth an Italian princess of the House of Savoy and was Queen of Portugal as spouse of King Luís I of Portugal. On the day of her baptism, Pope Pius IX, her godfather, gave her a Golden Rose. Maria Pia was married to Luís on the 6 October 1862 in Lisbon. She was the grand mistress of the Order of Saint Isabel. She was the third queen of the House of Savoy on the Portuguese throne, after Mafalda and Marie-Françoise of Savoy-Nemours.

Early life
Maria Pia was the youngest daughter of Victor Emmanuel II, the first King of Italy, by his wife Adelaide of Austria, a great-granddaughter of Leopold II, Holy Roman Emperor. Her sister Maria Clotilde was the "princesse Napoléon" as wife of Napoléon Joseph Charles Paul Bonaparte, and her brothers were King Umberto I of Italy and King Amadeo of Spain. She had three younger brothers, but all died prematurely. Additionally, she had four paternal half-siblings born out of wedlock, who were never recognized as royalty despite their rich heritage. 

Maria Pia married King Luís I of Portugal on 6 October 1862 at the age of 14 in the São Domingos Church in Lisbon, therefore she instantly became Queen consort of Portugal. A proxy wedding took place about a week before on September 27, 1862 with her cousin Prince Eugene of Savoy taking the role of the groom. On the 29th, Maria boarded a ship at Genoa to visit her new homeland. The ship sailed into Lisbon on 5 October. Obviously Maria was smitten with Luis, as she later wrote ‘I like him more than his picture.’ 

One year after the wedding at age 15, Maria Pia gave birth to her first son and heir, Carlos, Duke of Braganza. Despite her young age she proved to be a wonderful mother. She wrote ‘my little Charles is good. Oh, it is such a great fortune to be a mother. My little one is white and pink with the large blue eyes of his father. It seems that he has already six months instead of a few weeks. He is always, always with me!’  In 1865 she had another son, Afonso, Duke of Porto. Soon after her second pregnancy she experienced postpartum depression. In 1866, she had another son, who was either miscarried or stillborn. Her dead son was christened Miguel. This added to her mental health struggles.  She never had any more children and was most likely sterile due to the painful birth.

Despite her waning health problems both physical and mental, the queen was known to romp around with her sons and help with their studies, sometimes even studying alongside them. In October 1873, the queen noticed her sons being carried into the Atlantic Ocean from a lighthouse and dove after them. She was later rewarded a medal for her heroism.

Biography

As Queen, Maria Pia was considered by some as extravagant, but far more for her many charitable works in aid of the Portuguese people. She was known by the Portuguese people as an "angel of charity" and "mother of the poor" for her compassion and work on social causes. At a masquerade ball in 1865, she changed her costume three times. When the Portuguese parliament discussed her expenses, she replied saying "if you want a Queen, you have to pay for her.  As Queen, she was largely responsible for the interiors of the Ajuda Royal Palace in Lisbon, still used to this day for banquets during state visits by foreign heads of state.

Maria Pia did not involve herself in politics, but in a conflict with João Carlos Saldanha de Oliveira Daun, 1st Duke of Saldanha in 1870, she stated: "If I were the king, I would have you shot!" 

Over the years, Luís began to indulge in several extramarital affairs. Despite her husband’s apparent wandering eye, Maria remained faithful to her husband, therefore causing Maria a great deal of depression. It is speculated that she too had an affair with Thomas de Rosa Sousa but this was never confirmed, and may have just been some mean-spirited gossip most likely out of the mouth of Infanta Antónia of Portugal, her sister-in-law. The rumors got around to the queen and she responded indignantly “They can talk until they explode.” 

Maria and Antónia both generally disliked each other, this hatred grew to the point where Antónia would refer to the penultimate queen as ‘x’ in her letters to Luis.  Antónia strongly believed that Maria was having an affair and urged Luis to pursue a divorce, which was quite the double—standard considering she was well aware of Luis’ affairs. Maria also maintained a rocky relationship with her father-in-law Ferdinand II of Portugal, disapproving his morganatic marriage to an opera singer. 

Her son Carlos and his wife, Amelie, had a son named Luis Filipe, who was very close to his grandmother. Tragically they also conceived a premature daughter named Maria Ana who lived for only two hours. The Queen had always longed for a little girl, and was no stranger to this type of loss. She expressed her sympathy, describing her lost grandchild as “Very small, but perfect and beautiful, with well-defined features.” 

King Luís died on 19 October 1889 and Maria Pia became queen dowager. She remained very active and continued with her social projects while holding a dominating position at court. She served as regent during the absence of the king and queen abroad.
The queen dowager was devastated after the assassination of her son King Carlos I of Portugal and grandson Crown Prince Luís Filipe, Duke of Braganza, on 1 February  1908 on the Praça do Comércio in Lisbon. During her last years in Portugal, she withdrew from the public eye. She was deeply saddened after the military coup that deposed her remaining grandson, King Manuel II of Portugal, by the 5 October 1910 Revolution. 

Due to the 1910 coup that deposed Maria Pia’s grandson, Manuel II, and established the republic in Portugal, the whole Portuguese royal family was exiled. King Manuel and Queen Amelie went to England, while Maria Pia and Infante Afonso went to her native Italy, where she died on 5 July of the very next year in Stupinigi, and was interred in the Basilica of Superga.

Gallery

Issue

Ancestry

References

External links

1847 births
1911 deaths
Princesses of Savoy
Burials at the Basilica of Superga
Queen mothers
Nobility from Turin
House of Braganza-Saxe-Coburg and Gotha
Portuguese queens consort
Italian people of Polish descent
Portuguese people of Polish descent
Knights Grand Cross of the Order of the Immaculate Conception of Vila Viçosa
Dames of the Order of Saint Isabel
19th-century Italian women
19th-century Portuguese people
19th-century Portuguese women
Victor Emmanuel II of Italy
Daughters of kings